Ivo Malec (30 March 1925, in Zagreb – 14 August 2019, in Paris) was a Croatian-born French composer, music educator and conductor. One of the earliest Yugoslav composers to obtain high international regard, his works have been performed by symphony orchestras throughout Europe and North America.

Biography 
Coming from a rather 'classical' background, he met Pierre Schaeffer whom he considers his 'true and only master'; Schaeffer's teachings turned Malec into one of the most important leaders of the Groupe de recherches musicales. Since then he dedicated himself to a more radical style. He received a number of awards including the Grand Prix National de Musique in 1992. He was resident in France since 1955 and taught at the Paris Conservatoire from 1972 to 1990 where he taught composers such as Édith Canat de Chizy, Denis Dufour, Philippe Hurel, Philippe Leroux and Gerard Pesson. 

Malec's approach to composition which in ways is similar to that of Denis Dufour or Xenakis is the emphasis on all aspects of sound including texture, density, movement, timbre and notably sonic character and form and the use of sound objects.

Works 
Klaviersonate, 1949
Sinfonie, 1951
Cellosonate, 1956
Mouvements en coloeurs, 1959
Reflets, 1961
Sigma, 1963
Miniatures pour Lewis Carroll, 1964
Lignes et Points, 1965
Cantate pour elle, 1966
Oral, 1967
Lumina, 1968
Luminétudes, 1968
Lied, 1969
Dodécaméron, 1970
Pieris, 1975
Triola ou Symphonie pour moi-même, 1977–78
Week-end, 1982
Ottava bassa, 1984
Attacca, 1986
Artemisia, 1991
Doppio Coro, 1993
Exempla, 1994
Ottava alta, 1995
Sonoris causa, 1997
Arc-en-cello, 2000

References

External links
 Archive of official website at Archive.org (in French)
 France Musique's obituary dated 3 September 2019.

2019 deaths
1925 births
Musicians from Zagreb
Academic staff of the Conservatoire de Paris
Conservatoire de Paris alumni
Croatian composers
Academy of Music, University of Zagreb alumni
Chevaliers of the Légion d'honneur
Commandeurs of the Ordre des Arts et des Lettres
Yugoslav emigrants to France
French people of Croatian descent